Pumpkinhead: Blood Feud is a 2007 American made-for-television supernatural slasher horror film and the fourth installment in the Pumpkinhead film series of horror films. The film is written and directed by Michael Hurst.

Plot 
Two men on their motorcycles are driving away from Pumpkinhead. One of the men hits a tree branch in their path, falling from his motorcycle and allowing Pumpkinhead to catch up to him. As the man is being killed, the film cuts to a man in a log cabin who seems to share the pain inflicted by Pumpkinhead on the fallen man. The surviving man, named Dallas, rides to the log cabin, and the man who conjured Pumpkinhead, begging him to call the demon off. Pumpkinhead smashes through the window and Dallas attempts to fend him off by shooting him with a small pistol with little effect, and is clawed in the chest by the demon. When Dallas realizes that his bullets have no effect on Pumpkinhead, he swears to take the summoner with him, shooting the man and killing him, causing Pumpkinhead to vanish. Ed Harley then appears telling Dallas that Pumpkinhead will return and there will be no place to hide.

Five years later, it is shown that the family of the Hatfields' and McCoys' ongoing feud started because of a car in the 1930s. The Hatfields then trash a McCoy wedding. Jody Hatfield sneaks out to see her true love, Ricky McCoy. Ricky brings his sister, Sarah, to look out for him and Jody. The two then start to make out.

Jody's brothers find and kill Sarah by accident and try to kill Ricky. Ricky then finds his sister's body and goes to Haggis for help. Haggis tells him of the price it costs to summon Pumpkinhead, and Haggis is shown talking to Ed Harley's spirit. Haggis states that her choice does not matter in the end; only the summoner may make the decision to kill Pumpkinhead. The two invoke Pumpkinhead to kill the Hatfields.

Most of the Hatfields have been killed, as well as some of the McCoy family. Ricky realizes what he has done and takes Pumpkinhead with him to fall down a well.

Cast 

 Bob Gunter as Pumpkinhead
 Amy Manson as Jody Hatfield
 Bradley Taylor as Ricky McCoy
 Claire Lams as Dolly Hatfield
 Rob Freeman as Sheriff Dallas Pope
 Ovidiu Niculescu as Bobby Joe Hatfield
 Peter Barnes as Papa McCoy
 Lance Henriksen as Ed Harley
 Elvin Dandel as Tristan McCoy
 Richard Durden as Old Man Hatfield
 Alin Constantinescu as Emmett Hatfield
 Razvan Oprea as Brett Hatfield
 Rudy Rosenfeld as Abner Hatfield
 Lynne Verrall as Haggis
 Calin Puia as Tommy Hatfield
 Elias Ferkin as Billy Bob Hatfield
 Iulia Boros as Mama McCoy
 Maria Roman as Sara McCoy
 Bart Sidles as Andy Mills
 Alexandru Geoana as Town Boy #1
 Cristi Feter as Johnson
 Fanel Ursu as Johnny Pope
 Aurel Boata as Charlie Hatfield
 Daniel Tomescu as Dale Hatfield
 Dicu Marian as Wayne Hatfield
 Ion Carangea as Jimmy Langford
 Florin Barcun as Danny Hatfield
 Adrian Pavlovschi as Hatfield Boy #1
 Daniel Pasleaga as Hatfield Boy #2
 Mihai Ionita as McCoy Boy #1
 Vasilescu Valentin as McCoy Boy #2
 Isabela Melinte as Young McCoy Girl #1
 Catalina Alexandru as Young McCoy Girl #2

Production 
Initially announced as Pumpkinhead 4, it was filmed in Bucharest, Romania back-to-back with another sequel titled Pumpkinhead 3. The films were renamed Pumpkinhead: Blood Feud and Pumpkinhead: Ashes to Ashes, respectively, before their release.

Talks of another Pumpkinhead sequel were briefly considered, but these plans were abandoned in favor of a reboot to the franchise.

Release 
Pumpkinhead: Blood Feud premiered in Dayton, Ohio, on February 2, 2007, then made its broadcast premiere on Syfy on February 10.

Home media
It was released on DVD on October 2, 2007.

Reception 

Jon Condit of Dread Central rated it 3/5 stars and wrote that it is modestly entertaining. David Johnson of DVD Verdict wrote: "It's an adequate horror flick that maybe thinks it's a little more awesome than it actually is, but the sum total of the copious bloodletting and fun, old-school creature effects equals 'not a waste of time'".

References

External links 
 

2007 films
2007 television films
2007 horror films
American monster movies
British horror films
2000s monster movies
Dark fantasy films
Demons in film
Pumpkinhead (film series)
American supernatural horror films
Television sequel films
Films shot in Romania
Syfy original films
Films about witchcraft
British monster movies
American horror television films
Films produced by Donald Kushner
Films directed by Michael Hurst
2000s American films
2000s British films
Sony Pictures direct-to-video films